Aldochlay is a small hamlet in Argyll and Bute, Scotland, on the shore of Loch Lomond opposite the island of Inchtavannach and just south of Luss. It was formerly part of Dunbartonshire, but is now part of Argyll and Bute. The hamlet has no speed limit sign, due to it being a quiet hamlet.

It is known to many people for the small statue of a boy on a plinth in the loch.

References

Hamlets in Argyll and Bute